"Ride the Lightning (717 Tapes)" is a song by American country music singer Warren Zeiders (legal name, Brady Zeiders) born and raised in Hershey, Pennsylvania It was released on June 25, 2021 from his debut EP 717 Tapes. The song was co-written by Sean Zeiders, Eric Paslay and Rob Crosby.

Content
The song went viral on TikTok which helped the song garner over 85 million streams, and over 200 million views and 1.3 million followers on TikTok.

Chart performance
"Ride the Lightning (717 Tapes)" debuted at number 30 on the Billboard Hot Country Songs chart dated July 10, 2021, after its release.

Charts

Weekly charts

Year-end charts

Certifications

Release history

References

2021 songs
2021 debut singles
Songs written by Eric Paslay
Songs written by Rob Crosby
Internet memes